Behram Ali Guda is a locality in Hyderabad, Telangana, India.

Commercial area
The choice for shops at Bahrem Aliguda  is very good. There are some good function halls in this area which are quite popular for weddings and parties like Sri Nilayam Gardens, Gajjala Janga Reddy Gardens, Pindi Pulla Reddy Gardens, Edulakanti Ram Reddy Gardens,  KKK Gardens.

Transport
Bairamalguda is connected by buses run by TSRTC, since a bus depot is close by, it is well connected. Buses that run are 104R, 277, 293, 93 etc. The nearest MMTS train station is Malakpet MMTS station.and the nearest Hyderabad Metro station is LB Nagar.

References

Neighbourhoods in Hyderabad, India
Villages in Ranga Reddy district